Methine dyes (polymethine dyes) are dyes whose chromophoric system consists of conjugated double bonds (polyenes) flanked by two end groups: an electron acceptor A and an electron donor D.

Structural of methine dyes

Methine dyes comprise an odd number of methine groups. The end groups can also be part of a heterocycle or the double bonds part of an aromatic system: The methine dye subclasses are based on these structural differences. Methine dyes can furthermore be classified as cationic, anionic or neutral.

If one or more methine groups are replaced by a heteroatom - usually nitrogen - one speaks of heteroanalogous (aza-analogous) methine dyes.

General properties and classification 
Methine dyes can be characterized as polyene dyes with terminal electron donating and accepting groups. In the majority of cases, these terminal groups contain nitrogen or oxygen atoms. However, while the naturally occurring polyene dyes (such as carotenoids) are limited to yellow to yellow-red tones, almost all colours of the spectrum can be achieved with the predominantly synthetic methine dyes.

Cyanine dyes 

The most well-known group of methine dyes are the cationic cyanine dyes. Both terminal groups of the chromophore contain nitrogen atoms, whereas the amino or imino group is part of a heterocycle.
general structure of cyanine dyes

Hemicyanine dyes 

In the case of hemicyanine dyes, one terminal amino group is part of a heterocycle, while the second terminal group is open-chain.
general structure of hemicyanine dyes

Streptocyanine dyes 
If both terminal amino and imino groups of the chromophore are open chain, one speaks of streptocyanine dyes.
general structure of streptocyanine dyes

Merocyanine dyes 
Merocyanine dyes have an amino and a carbonyl group as end groups of the polyene structural element. Both a neutral and a zwitterionic resonance structure can be described for this compound type.
general structure of merocyanine dyes

Oxonol dyes 

Members of the oxonol dyes, whose terminal groups contain oxygen as heteroatom, play a role in analogue colour photography and the following of enzymatic reactions via the use of barbituric and thiobarbituric terminal groups.
general structure of oxonol dyes

Styryl dyes 
By condensing an active methylene compound (e.g. malonic acid dinitrile) with a benzaldehyde derivative, styryl dyes are obtained. By integrating a benzene ring into the polyene part, these compounds have a styrene partial structure. Styryl dyes are used as disperse dyes in the dyeing of polyester fibers.

Example: Preparation of C.I. Disperse Yellow 31 (3) by condensation of ethyl cyanoacetate (1) with a p-aminobenzaldehyde derivative.

Synthesis of C.I. Disperse Yellow 31 (3)

Di- and triarylmethine dyes 
Also amino- and hydroxy-substituted di- and triarylmethines comprise the structural element of a methine dye:
Triarylmethine dyes, resonance structure (R=H, alkyl)
Triarylmethine dyes are derived from triphenylmethane, in which at least two of the aromatic rings have electron-donating substituents (e.g. amino groups, secondary and tertiary alkylamino groups or hydroxy groups). They are therefore also referred to in older literature as triarylmethane dyes. For the dyes, resonance structure can be described as a carbenium ion or with an iminocyclohexadiene or cyclohexadienone partial structure. The central carbon atom in the dyes is therefore not sp3- but sp2-hybridized.

Triarylmethine dyes usually show intensive, luminous colourings with different light fastness. In addition to dyeing and printing textiles, leather and paper, they are also used for printing inks, inks, ballpoint pen pastes and as microscopic dyes. As functional dyes, some representatives of this dye class are used as indicators (phenolphthalein), as disinfectants, anthelmintics and antifungals (e.g. malachite green, crystal violet).

Examples:

Aza-analog methine dyes 
If a methine group in a methine dye is replaced by a nitrogen atom, a azamethine dye is obtained (example: C.I. Basic Yellow 28). Accordingly, diazamethine dyes are obtained by replacing two methine groups with nitrogen atoms. Diazahemicyanine dyes (examples: C.I. Basic Red 22 and C.I. Basic Blue 41) in particular are an important class of methine dyes and are used as cationic dyes in the dyeing of polyacrylonitrile fibers.

Examples:

The quinonimine dyes are aza-analogous members of the diarylmethine dyes:

References 

Dyes